The National Research Foundation of Korea (NRF) was established in 2009 as a merger of Korea Science and Engineering Foundation (KOSEF), Korea Research Foundation (KRF), and Korea Foundation for International Cooperation of Science and Technology (KICOS). It provides support for research into new theories for the advancement of science, the arts, and the Korean culture in general. The foundation was first established in 1981.  Its offices are located in 25 Heolleung-ro, Seocho-gu, Seoul and 201 Gajeong-ro, Yuseong-gu, Daejeon.

Budget
Total: $6.427 million (1 USD = 1,100 KRW)
Basic Research in Science and Engineering ($1.864 million), Humanities & Social Sciences ($234 million), National Strategic R&D Programs ($2.032 million), Academic Research & University Funding ($2.071 million), International Cooperation ($67 million), Others Areas ($159 million)

Organization

 7 directorates,  2 centers, 18 divisions, 20 offices, 46 Teams
President
 Board of Directors 
 Policy Advisory Committee
 Research Ethics Committee
 Audit 
 Office of Audits and Inspections 
 Directorate for Basic Research in Science and Engineering 
 Division of Natural Sciences 
 Division of Life Sciences 
 Division of Medical Sciences 
 Division of Engineering 
 Division of ICT and Convergence Research 
 Office of Basic Research Planning 
 Office of Basic Research Management 

 Directorate for Humanities & Social Sciences
 Division of Humanities
 Division of Social Sciences
 Division of Arts, Culture and Convergence
 Office of Humanities & Social Sciences Planning
 Office of Humanities & Social Sciences Management
 Directorate for National Strategic R&D Programs
 Division of Drug Discovery and Development
 Division of Next Generation Biotechnology
 Division of Neuroscience and Advanced Medical Technology
 Division of Nano-Semiconductor Technology
 Division of Material-Part Technology
 Division of ICT & Convergence Technology
 Division of Energy and Environment Technology
 Division of Space Technology
 Division of Nuclear Technology
 Division of Public Technology
 Office of National Strategic R&D Planning
 Office of Fundamental R&D Programs
 Office of Big Science Programs
 Directorate for Academic Research
 Office of Academic Research Affairs
 Office of HR Development
 Office of University Education Management
 Office of University-Industry Cooperation
 Directorate for International Affairs
 Office of International Cooperation Planning
 Office of International Cooperation Framework
 Office of International Networks
 Directorate for Digital Innovation
 Office of R&D Policy and Strategy 
 Office of Data & Information
 Information Security Task Force
 Directorate for Management and Operations
 Office of Administration
 Office of Financial Management
 Office of Research Ethics
 Office of Planning and Coordination
 Office of Public Relations

Main Activities
Support for academic research and development activities
Support for the cultivation and utilization of researchers in academic research and development
Promotion of international cooperation for academic research and development activities
Support for collecting, investigating, analyzing, assessing, managing and using the materials and information necessary for academic research and development and the formulation of related policies
Support for research and operation of organizations related to academic research and development
Support for exchange and cooperation among domestic and overseas organizations related to academic research and development
Other matters necessary for academic research and development

Presidents
 Park Chan-Mo (June 26, 2009–January 19, 2011)
 Oh Se-Jung (January 20, 2011–January 5, 2012)
 Lee Seung-Jong (January 6, 2012–January 2, 2014)
 Chung Min-Keun (January 3, 2014–August 22, 2016)
 Cho Moo-je (August 23, 2016–July 8, 2018)
 Roe Jung-hye (July 9, 2018–September 26, 2021)
 Lee Kwang-bok (September 27, 2021–present)

See also
Korea Citation Index
Korean studies
Government of South Korea

Notes

External links
Official English-language site

Cultural studies organizations
Korean studies
Scholarships in South Korea